Inna Yevseyeva (born 14 August 1964) is a retired middle-distance athlete who specialised in the 800 metres. She was born in Zhytomyr, Ukrainian SSR and represented the Soviet Union in the 1980s and the early 1990s, and then Ukraine. A two-time Olympian, Yevseyeva finished sixth in the 1988 Olympic 800 m final in Seoul and fourth in the 1992 Olympic 800 m final in Barcelona. She set her personal best in the women's 800 metres with 1:56.0 on 4 July 1988 at a meet in Kharkov, which made her the fastest 800m woman in the world for 1988.

References

Profile

1964 births
Living people
Ukrainian female middle-distance runners
Soviet female middle-distance runners
Athletes (track and field) at the 1988 Summer Olympics
Athletes (track and field) at the 1992 Summer Olympics
Olympic athletes of the Soviet Union
Olympic athletes of the Unified Team
Sportspeople from Zhytomyr
World Athletics Championships athletes for the Soviet Union
World Athletics Championships athletes for Ukraine
Universiade medalists in athletics (track and field)
Universiade gold medalists for the Soviet Union
Medalists at the 1991 Summer Universiade
Medalists at the 1989 Summer Universiade